Minnesota State Highway 6 (MN 6) is a  highway in east-central and north-central Minnesota, which runs from its intersection with State Highway 18 in Bay Lake Township near Garrison and continues north to its northern terminus at its intersection with U.S. Highway 71 and County Road 30 in Big Falls.

Route description
State Highway 6 serves as a north–south route between Bay Lake Township, Deerwood, Crosby, Remer, Deer River, and Big Falls in east-central and north-central Minnesota.

The route passes through the Chippewa National Forest in Cass and Itasca counties.

Highway 6 passes through the following state forests:
 Crow Wing State Forest (briefly) in Crow Wing County
 Land O'Lakes State Forest in Cass County
 Remer State Forest in Cass County
 Big Fork State Forest in Itasca County
 Koochiching State Forest in Koochiching County

Schoolcraft State Park is located on Highway 6 in Cass County on the banks of the Mississippi River. The park is located south of Deer River and west of Grand Rapids.

Highway 6 parallels U.S. Highway 169 for part of its route in northern Minnesota.

The route also parallels scenic State Highway 38 for part of its route.

History
State Highway 6 was authorized in 1920 and 1933.

The route was completely paved by 1970.

Major intersections

References

006
Transportation in Crow Wing County, Minnesota
Transportation in Cass County, Minnesota
Transportation in Itasca County, Minnesota
Transportation in Koochiching County, Minnesota